Lieutenant General Amardeep Singh Bhinder, PVSM, AVSM, VSM is a former general officer of the Indian Army. He last served as the General Officer Commanding-in-Chief South Western Command from 2021 to 2023. He assumed command from Lieutenant General Alok Singh Kler on 1 April 2021.

Career 
Bhinder was commissioned in the 9th Horse (Deccan Horse) in June 1983. A graduate of the National Defence Academy , Khadakwasla, he has commanded both an armoured brigade and an armoured division, and has also served as a UN peacekeeping force military observer. He served as Director General Military Training at Integrated HQ before taking command of the elite I Corps on 31 January 2019. He then served as Deputy Chief of the Army Staff (Information Systems) before assuming command of the South Western Command.

Awards and decorations
Bhinder has been decorated with the Vishisht Seva Medal (VSM) and the Ati Vishisht Seva Medal (AVSM), which he was awarded in the 2021 Republic Day honours. 

Source:

Dates of rank

References 

Living people
Indian generals
Recipients of the Ati Vishisht Seva Medal
Recipients of the Vishisht Seva Medal
Indian Army officers
Year of birth missing (living people)
Defence Services Staff College alumni
Academic staff of the Defence Services Staff College
Rashtriya Indian Military College alumni